Teleiopsis brevivalva is a moth of the family Gelechiidae. It is found in India.

The larvae feed on Juglans regia from within rolled leaves.

References

Moths described in 1988
Teleiopsis